Bradley Scott Owen (born May 23, 1950) is an American businessman and politician who served as the 15th Lieutenant Governor of Washington from 1997 to 2017. A member of the Democratic Party, he was previously elected to the Washington State Legislature from 1977 to 1997, spending six years in the Washington House of Representatives and fourteen years in the Washington State Senate.

Biography

Owen was born and raised in Tacoma, Washington. He was a small business owner before entering politics. He was elected as Shelton City Finance Commissioner and to the Washington House of Representatives in 1976 and served in those capacities until 1983, when he was elected to the Washington State Senate. In 1989, he formed a non-profit organization called Strategies for Youth, first as a way to fight substance abuse among Washington's young people and later with a greater emphasis on bullying and respecting diversity. The program concluded in 2011.

In 1996, Owen moved from the legislature to the executive branch with his election as lieutenant governor. He was re-elected to that position in 2000, 2004, 2008 and 2012. Following findings by the state's Executive Ethics Commission that Owen improperly used tax-payer resources, which led to a $15,000 fine being imposed against him, Owen announced that he would not seek another term in the 2016 election. Prior to that announcement, three current legislators from his own party had already begun campaigning for his office. His final term expired in January 2017. He was succeeded in office by Cyrus Habib.

Owen is opposed to abortion, he campaigns against drug use and drug legalisation and he is described as "lukewarm" on gay rights. He has received criticism for his work ethic, not working outside of the legislative calendar, conducting remote work and prioritizing his outside business interests ahead of his duties as Lieutenant Governor. In September 2014, he was fined $15,000 for breaking state law by using state resources to run Strategies for Youth, his personal non-profit group.

On April 2, 2008, the King of Spain Juan Carlos I bestowed the Order of Isabella the Catholic, or Spanish knighthood, on Owen.

Electoral history

References

External links
 Campaign website
 Lieutenant Governor of Washington website
 

1950 births
21st-century American politicians
American people of Welsh descent
Lieutenant Governors of Washington (state)
Living people
Democratic Party members of the Washington House of Representatives
Politicians from Tacoma, Washington
Democratic Party Washington (state) state senators